Fleitas v. Richardson, 147 U.S. 550 (1893), was a United States Supreme Court case in which the Court held that under the Louisiana Code, the liability of the husband to the wife for her separate property received by him under the marriage contract is in the nature of a debt secured by mortgage of his lands, and may be enforced by her by direct suit against him. It may also be extinguished by his discharge in bankruptcy.

Background
The plaintiff, Mary C. W. Fleitas, was married to Francis B. Fleitas on February 6, 1868, in St. Bernard Parish, Louisiana. Before the marriage, the couple and her parents signed a marriage contract which provided that her parents' gift of $20,000 would be secured by a mortgage by Francis Fleitas in favor of his wife, as provided by Louisiana law.  This law determined that her parents' contribution was a dotal (or dowry contribution).

On April 25, 1877, Francis B. Fleitas obtained a discharge in bankruptcy in the United States District Court for the Eastern District of Louisiana. In 1884, Francis Fleitas purchased land, with a mortgage held by Gilbert M. Richardson, a citizen of New York, Albert R. Shattuck and Francis B. Hoffman, citizens of Massachusetts, the Defendants in this case.

On September 3, 1887, the Mrs. Fleitas filed a petition in the state court in St. Bernard Parish against her husband for separation of property, and for a recognition of her mortgage on all his lands in that parish, alleging that he was largely in debt and that there was danger that his estate would not be sufficient to satisfy her rights and claims. On September 10, 1887, she recovered judgment against Fleitas decreeing a separation of property between them and ordering that the sum of $20,000, held by him as her paraphernal property, be returned to her and be recognized as secured by legal mortgage on all his lands in that parish.  The sheriff executed the order, whereupon, on June 29, 1888, Richardson instituted executory proceedings upon the mortgage of January 28, 1884, for the seizure and sale of the lands, as set forth in the next preceding case, the record of which was made part of the record in this case.

The case was duly removed by said defendants into the circuit court of the United States upon the grounds that there was a separable controversy between them and the plaintiff, and that the suit involved a question under the bankrupt law of the United States as to the effect of the husband's discharge in bankruptcy upon the plaintiff's claim and mortgage.

Opinion of the Court
The Court started by explaining and applying Louisiana's laws governing the rights of married women, which "differs widely from the common law." Fleitas at 552. Citing Louisiana Code articles Articles 2334 and 2335, the Court explained that the separate property of the wife is that which she 'brings into the marriage, or acquires during the marriage by inheritance or by donation made to her particularly,' and 'is divided into dotal and extradotal property. Dotal property is that which the wife brings to the husband to assist him in bearing the expenses of the marriage establishment. Extradotal property, otherwise called "paraphernal property," is that which forms no part of the dowry.

The liability of the husband to the wife for her separate property received by him under the marriage contract is in the nature of a debt secured by mortgage of his lands and may be enforced by her by direct suit against him.

The wife may, at any time during the marriage, sue the husband for a separation of property, "when the disorder of his affairs induces her to believe that his estate may not be sufficient to meet her rights and claims." Louisiana Civil Code, art. 2425, (2399). Consequently, a transfer of property, or a confession of judgment, by an insolvent husband to his wife, in settlement of her claims, is good against his creditors. Citing Lehman v. Levy, 30 La. Ann. 745, 750; Levi v. Morgan, 33 La. Ann. 532; Thompson v. Freeman, 34 La. Ann. 992.

Such being the nature of the liability of the husband to the wife for her paraphernal property under the law of Louisiana, it was clearly provable by her against him as a debt under the bankrupt act of the United States. Rev. St. 5067; In re Bigelow, 3 Ben. 198; In re Blandin, 1 Low. 543; In re Jones, 6 Biss. 68, 78.

It is equally clear that it has none of the elements of a trust, certainly not of such a technical trust as to make it a fiduciary debt, within the meaning of that act; and that consequently it was barred by his discharge in bankruptcy. Rev. St. [147 U.S. 550, 556]   5117, 5119; Hennequin v. Clews, 111 U.S. 676, 4 Sup. Ct. Rep. 576; Upshur v. Briscoe, 138 U.S. 365, 11 Sup. Ct. Rep. 313.

Having determined that, the Court then turned to the second question: whether the Fleitases can avail themselves of that discharge.  The Court opined that under Louisiana law, the debt of the husband to the wife was extinguished by his discharge in bankruptcy; and thereupon her mortgage, which was but a security for that debt, disappeared with it, and could not attach to these lands upon his subsequently purchasing them; and the appellees, claiming as his creditors under the mortgage from him to them, were entitled to set up his discharge in bankruptcy against any lien claimed by her upon the lands.

See also
List of United States Supreme Court cases, volume 147

External links

1893 in United States case law
United States Supreme Court cases of the Fuller Court
Louisiana law
United States bankruptcy case law
Marriage law in the United States
United States Supreme Court cases